Radmilo Mišović (born 14 March 1943), is a Serbian former professional basketball executive, player and coach.

Playing career 
A guard, Mišović spent entire playing career with his hometown teams Borac and Železničar, playing from 1958 to 1980. He is the all-time leader in points scored of the Yugoslav League, scoring 7,456 points over 280 games played. Also, he is a five time scoring champion, winning the Yugoslav scoring title during the 1967–68, 1968–69, 1970–71, 1971–72, and 1973–74 seasons.

National team career 
In 1966, Mišović was a member of the Yugoslavia national team that won a gold medal at the Balkan Basketball Championship in Sofia, Bulgaria.

Coaching career 
Mišović was the head coach of the Borac Čačak youth system in 1967, as well as of the senior team in 1969 (player-coach). In 1969, Borac Čačak competed in the Serbian League, South Division.

Post-playing career 
Between 1969 and 2010, Mišović worked as an executive and administrator for KK Borac Čačak, holding numerous positions through the time, such as a director or club's president.

As a member of the Party of Serbian Unity, Mišović won a seat in the National Assembly of Serbia at the 2000 Serbian parliamentary election. After the 2003 election, he retired from politics. Serbia was a part of FR Yugoslavia during that period.

Awards 
 Order of Labour with Silver Wreath
 City of Čačak October Award (1973)
 Best Sportsperson of Čačak in the 20th century
 City of Čačak December Award (2008)
 May Award for Lifetime Achievement (2018)

See also 
 Yugoslav First Federal Basketball League career stats leaders
 List of Yugoslav First Federal Basketball League annual scoring leaders

References

1943 births
Living people
Basketball players from Čačak
Guards (basketball)
KK Borac Čačak coaches
KK Borac Čačak players
KK Železničar Čačak players
Members of the National Assembly (Serbia)
Player-coaches
Politicians from Čačak
Serbian basketball executives and administrators
Serbian men's basketball coaches
Serbian men's basketball players
Yugoslav basketball coaches
Yugoslav men's basketball players
Recipients of orders, decorations, and medals of Yugoslavia